Herbert G. Lewin (June 22, 1914 – March 18, 2010) was a third-party candidate Internationalist Workers Party for President of the United States in the 1988 U.S. presidential election. His running mate was Vikki Murdock from California. They won approximately 10,370 votes, 9,953 of them from New Jersey. He was a union activist for the United Electrical, Radio and Machine Workers of America.

Lewin had previously run for Governor of Pennsylvania in 1950 as the candidate of the Militant Worker Party coming in last place with 841 votes versus the 1.7 million of John S. Fine. Lewin ran in 1956 for United States Senator from Pennsylvania winning 2,640 votes against the 2.2 million votes for Joseph S. Clark.

After his retirement, Lewin, a machinist with Westinghouse Electric Corporation's Lester (PA) Steam Turbine Division, served as a substitute teacher in Philadelphia's vocational public high schools.

He died on March 18, 2010, at the age of 95 from heart failure.

References 

 "Historical Election Statistics" Pennsylvania Department of General Services (PDF)
 David Grann "The Infiltrators: What You Don't Know About Lenora Fulani Could Hurt You" The New Republic, December 13, 1999

1914 births
2010 deaths
American trade unionists
Socialist Workers Party (United States) politicians from Pennsylvania
Candidates in the 1988 United States presidential election
20th-century American politicians